St John the Baptist's Church is a redundant Anglican church in the settlement of Blawith, Cumbria, England. It is located to the east of the A5084 road, south of Coniston Water in the Lake District.

New church
St John's was designed by the Lancaster architect E. G. Paley and built in 1862–63. It is constructed in whinstone with a slate roof, and was built to replace an older church, also dedicated to Saint John the Baptist. Its plan consists of a nave, with a short chancel and a bellcote. The windows are lancets containing plate tracery.  The church cost £1,600, and had seating for a congregation of 169 or 171.  Its architectural style is Gothic Revival, and it contains stained glass windows in the chancel depicting the Ascension, the Presentation in the Temple, and the Adoration of the Magi. In 1914, Paley's successors Austin, Paley and Austin rebuilt the chancel arch and the top part of the east wall at a cost of £196, and in 1926 the same practice carried out repairs to the north and west walls, and added buttresses to the south wall of the nave. The church was declared redundant on 1 March 1988.

Old church

The ruins of the older church remain nearby, on the other side of the road.  This church was built in the 16th century and it was rebuilt in 1749.  It was "little better than a barn, of
small dimensions, without a tower or steeple" and by 1861 was in "so ruinous a condition" that it had to be replaced. The ruins are recorded in the National Heritage List for England as a designated Grade II listed building.

See also

Listed buildings in Blawith and Subberthwaite
List of ecclesiastical works by E. G. Paley
List of ecclesiastical works by Austin and Paley (1895–1914)

References
Citations

Sources

External links
Photographs from Visit Cumbria

Churches completed in 1863
19th-century Church of England church buildings
Blawith
Ruins in Cumbria
Blawith
Gothic Revival church buildings in England
Blawith
Churches preserved by the Churches Conservation Trust
Church buildings by E. G. Paley
Austin and Paley buildings